The following is a list of notable deaths in March 1993.

Entries for each day are listed alphabetically by surname. A typical entry lists information in the following sequence:
 Name, age, country of citizenship at birth, subsequent country of citizenship (if applicable), reason for notability, cause of death (if known), and reference.

March 1993

1
Joseph Christopher, 37, American serial killer, male breast cancer.
Terry Frost, 86, American actor (Law of the Range, Cheyenne, The Maverick), heart attack.
Rudolph Glossop, 91, British mining and civil engineer.
Luis Kutner, 84, American lawyer.
Ronald McCuaig, 84, Australian poet, journalist, and children's author.
Nicola Monti, 72, Italian opera singer.
Oleg Zaytsev, 53, Soviet ice hockey defenceman.

2
André Bareau, 71, French Buddhologist.
Julius Ebert, 94, Danish runner and Olympian.
Hans Hilfiker, 91, Swiss engineer (Swiss railway clock).
Hjalmar Thomsen, 79, Danish Olympic field hockey player (1948).
Paul D. Zimmerman, 54, American screenwriter (The King of Comedy), colon cancer.

3
Mel Bradford, 58, American politician and academic.
Robert Carricart, 76, French-American film, television and theatre actor.
Bill Draut, 71, American comic book artist (Phantom Stranger, The Flash, House of Mystery).
Jesús Bal y Gay, 87, Spanish composer, music critic, and musicologist.
Harper Goff, 81, American musician, art director, and actor.
Yoshio Kojima, 61, Japanese hammer thrower and Olympian, suicide.
Carlos Marcello, 83, Italian-American mobster (New Orleans crime family), stroke.
Carlos Montoya, 89, Spanish flamenco guitarist, heart failure.
James Allen Red Dog, 39, American convicted murderer, execution by lethal injection.
Albert Sabin, 86, Polish-American virologist, heart failure.
Xie Xuegong, 76, Chinese politician.

4
Jerome Ambro, 64, American politician.
Georgette Anys, 83, French actress, cancer.
Anšlavs Eglītis, 86, Latvian writer, journalist and painter, cancer.
Art Hodes, 88, American jazz pianist.
Tomislav Ivčić, 40, Croatian pop singer, songwriter and politician, traffic collision.
Varujan Kojian, 57, Armenian-American conductor.
Izaak Kolthoff, 99, Dutch-American chemist and academic.
Kaisu Leppänen, 88, Finnish actress.
Nicholas Ridley, Baron Ridley of Liddesdale, 64, English politician, MP (1959–1992), lung cancer.
Richard Sale, 81, American screenwriter and director.

5
Colin Allan, 71, New Zealand colonial administrator and author.
Alfred Ashley-Brown, 85, Australian politician, MP (1972–1974).
Hans Christian Blech, 78, German actor.
Cyril Collard, 35, French filmmaker (Savage Nights), AIDS.
Herschel Daugherty, 82, American television and film director and actor.
Jean Földeák, 89, German wrestler.
Wallace Givens, 82, American mathematician and computer scientist.
Egil Borgen Johansen, 58, Norwegian Olympic archer (1972).
Robert McCance, 94, British paediatrician, biochemist and nutritionist.
Jeyhun Mirzayev, 46, Azerbaijani actor, heart attack.
Robert Sawyer, 41, American convicted murderer, execution by lethal injection.
Mac Speedie, 73, American gridiron football player.

6
Takahide Aioi, 81, Japanese flying ace during World War II.
Valentina Borisenko, 73, Soviet chess player.
Andrew Gilchrist, 82, Scottish diplomat.
Dan Johnson, 48, Canadian ice hockey player.
Douglas Marland, 58, American screenwriter (Guiding Light, As the World Turns, Another World), complications from abdominal surgery.
Walther Siegmund-Schultze, 76, German musicologist.

7
Mariya Barabanova, 81, Soviet and Russian stage and film actress.
Duane Carter, 79, American racing driver.
Arnold Franchetti, 81–82, Italian-American composer.
Tony Harris, 76, South African cricket player.
Whitey Kachan, 67, American basketball player.
J. Merrill Knapp, 78, American musicologist and academic.
Martti Larni, 83, Finnish writer.
Patricia Lawrence, 67, English actress.
Carlo Mazzarella, 73, Italian actor and journalist, lung cancer.
Angelo Piccaluga, 86, Italian football player.
Jim Spavital, 66, American gridiron football player, coach and executive.
Jeremy Tree, 67, British thoroughbred racehorse trainer.
Earl Wrightson, 77, American singer, heart failure.

8
Ria Bancroft, 86, British-New Zealand artist.
Don Barksdale, 69, American basketball player, throat cancer.
Wilhelm Georg Berger, 63, Romanian composer, violist and conductor.
Solomon J. Buchsbaum, 63, Polish-American physicist, multiple myeloma.
Billy Eckstine, 78, American jazz musician, stroke.
Berent Schwineköper, 80, German archivist and historian.
Johannes Türn, 93, Estonian chess player.
Rens Vis, 88, Dutch football player.
Carl A. Youngdale, 80, American Marine Corps major general.

9
Bob Crosby, 79, American singer, actor, and television host (The Bob Crosby Show), cancer.
Jan Larsen, 47, Danish football (soccer) player.
C. Northcote Parkinson, 83, British naval historian.
Pavel Pavlenko, 90, Soviet stage and film actor.
Wells Root, 92, American screenwriter (The Prisoner of Zenda).
Vanya Voynova, 58, Bulgarian basketball player.
Edwin Vásquez, 70, Peruvian sport shooter and Olympic champion.
Harry Wright, 73, American football player and coach.
Max August Zorn, 86, German-American mathematician.

10
Dino Bravo, 44, American professional wrestler, shot.
David Gunn, 47, American abortion care provider, murdered.
Camille Howard, 78, American pianist and singer.
Vladimir Suteev, 89, Russian author, artist and animator.
Guido Wieland, 86, Austrian stage, film and television actor.

11
Tibor Donner, 85, Hungarian-Australian architect.
Manuel da Fonseca, 81, Portuguese writer.
Myrtle Maclagan, 81, English cricket player.
Pragyananda Mahasthavir, 92, Nepalese buddhist monk.
Irene Ware, 82, American actress.

12
Iuliu Bodola, 81, Romanian-Hungarian football player.
Lonnie Frisbee, 43, American evangelist and mystic, AIDS-related complications.
Syed Shahid Hamid, 82, Pakistan Army general.
Habib Jalib, 64, Pakistani revolutionary poet, and activist.
Michael Kanin, 83, American screenwriter (Woman of the Year, Teacher's Pet), Oscar winner (1943), heart failure.
Annamalai Ramanathan, 46, Indian mathematician, complications from a heart attack.
Alex Taylor, 46, American singer.
June Valli, 64, American singer and television personality, cancer.
Wang Zhen, 84, Chinese general and politician, vice president (since 1988).

13
Claire Huchet Bishop, 94, Swiss-American children's writer and librarian.
Rocky Dzidzornu, 58, Ghanaian percussionist.
Gene Hartley, 67, American racecar driver.
Gaetano Kanizsa, 79, Italian psychologist and artist.
Albert Maori Kiki, 61, Papua New Guinea politician.
Pat Marcy, 79, Italian-American political boss.
Petar Mazev, 66, Macedonian academic painter.
Henry Morris, 73, Scottish football player.
Jean Tamini, 73, Swiss football player.
Ann Way, 77, English film and television actress.

14
Dick Arrington, 51, American football player, heart attack.
Marcus Bartley, 75, Anglo-Indian cinematographer.
Larz Bourne, 77, American cartoon writer.
Ahmad Ebadi, 87, Iranian musician and setar player.
Thore Enochsson, 84, Swedish Olympic runner (1936).
Sergio Manente, 68, Italian football player and coach.
Harold Soref, 76, English politician, MP (1970–1974).
Albert Watson II, 84, American Army lieutenant general.

15
Georgette Chen, 86, Singaporean painter.
Paul Easterling, 87, American baseball player (Detroit Tigers).
Ricardo Arias Espinosa, 80, Panamanian politician, president (1955–1956).
Gustav A. Hedlund, 88, American mathematician.
Lennart Hyland, 73, Swedish TV-show host and journalist.
Edo Kovačević, 86, Croatian artist.
Karl Mai, 64, German football player and manager, leukemia.

16
Natália Correia, 69, Portuguese intellectual, poet and social activist, heart attack.
Johnny Cymbal, 48, Scottish-American songwriter, singer and record producer.
Gordon Donaldson, 79, Scottish historian.
Ralph Fults, 82, American outlaw (Barrow Gang).
Srirangam Gopalaratnam, 53–54, Indian singer.
Muhammad Khan Junejo, 60, Pakistani politician, prime minister (1985–1988), leukemia.
Donald Randolph, 87, American actor, pneumonia.
Chishū Ryū, 88, Japanese actor.
Giovanni Testori, 69, Italian dramatist.
Erich Valentin, 86, German musicologist.
Odiel Van Den Meersschaut, 73, Belgian racing cyclist.

17
Joe Abreu, 79, American baseball player.
Helen Hayes, 92, American actress (The Sin of Madelon Claudet, Airport, Happy Birthday), Oscar winner (1932, 1971), congestive heart failure.
Charlotte Hughes, 115, English supercentenarian, nation's oldest person (since 1988).
Alby Pannam, 78, Australian footballer.
John Joyce Russell, 95, American Roman Catholic prelate.
Thorstein Treholt, 81, Norwegian politician, county governor of Oppland (1976–1981).
John Witte, 60, American gridiron football player, leukemia.
Skip Young, 63, American actor (The Adventures of Ozzie and Harriet).

18
William K. Boardman, 78, American politician, member of the Alaska House of Representatives (1961–1971).
Kenneth E. Boulding, 83, English-American economist.
Elemér Gyetvai, 65, Hungarian table tennis player.
Edward Warburton Jones, 80, Northern Irish judge and politician.
Buck Jordan, 86, American baseball player.
Henrik Lubbers, 66, American field hockey player and Olympian.
Aksel Nikolajsen, 92, Danish Olympic pole vaulter (1928).
Carlos A. Petit, 80, Argentine screenwriter.
Syvasky Poyner, 36, American convicted murderer, execution by electric chair.
Robert A. Rushworth, 68, American general, pilot, and astronaut, heart attack.
Joe Taylor, 67, American baseball player.

19
Bernie Crimmins, 73, American football player and coach.
Karen Dalton, 55, American folk blues musician, laryngeal cancer.
Georges Garvarentz, 60, Armenian-French composer.
Dulcie Howes, 84, South African ballet dancer, and choreographer.
Mark Hughes, 60, English politician, MP (1970–1987).
Al McWilliams, 77, American comics artist.
Gerhard Mertins, 73, German paratrooper during World War II, nazi and arms trafficker.
Roger Michelot, 80, French boxer.
Henrik Sandberg, 77, Danish film producer.
Jeff Ward, 30, American drummer (Nine Inch Nails), suicide by carbon monoxide poisoning.

20
Arsène Auguste, 42, Haitian footballer, heart attack.
Naseer Bunda, 60, Field hockey player from Pakistan.
Robert Burnham, Jr., 61, American astronomer.
Børge Jessen, 85, Danish mathematician.
Polykarp Kusch, 82, German-American physicist, Nobel Prize recipient (1955).
Rachel Messerer, 91, Russian silent film actress.
Vivekananda Mukhopadhyaya, 89, Indian writer of Bengali literature.
Gerard Sekoto, 79, South African artist and musician.
Toni Spiss, 62, Austrian alpine skier.

21
Sebastiano Baggio, 79, Italian Catholic cardinal.
Eric Guerin, 68, American jockey.
Michael Hutchison, 79, Scottish politician.
Akio Kaminaga, 56, Japanese judoka, colorectal cancer.
Cyril Kellett, 34, English rugby player.
Albert Ramon, 72, Belgian racing cyclist.
Buddy Swan, 63, American child actor.
Digby Tatham-Warter, 75, British Army officer.
Walther Wüst, 91, German Indologist.

22
Samiha Ayverdi, 87, Turkish writer and Sufi mystic.
John J. Beck, 93, American politician.
Phia Berghout, 83, Dutch harpist.
Enzo Fiermonte, 84, Italian actor and boxer.
Leopold Labedz, 73, Anglo-Polish anti-Soviet Unioncommentator.
Sun Meiying, 61, Chinese table tennis player.
Steve Olin, 27, American baseball player (Cleveland Indians), boating accident.
Vazir Orujov, 36, Azerbaijani soldier, killed in action.
Gret Palucca, 91, German ballet dancer and dance teacher.
Cec Pepper, 76, Australian cricket player, heart disease.
Jack Riley, 83, American football player (Boston Redskins).
Franklin Delano Williams, 45, American gospel singer (The Williams Brothers), heart attack.

23
Denis Parsons Burkitt, 82, Irish surgeon.
Tim Crews, 31, American baseball player (Los Angeles Dodgers), boating accident.
Robert Crichton, 68, American novelist.
Bruce Alexander McDonald, 68, Australian Army officer.
Yevdokiya Nikulina, 75, Soviet bomber commander and Hero of the Soviet Union.
Torsten Rapp, 87, Swedish Air Force officer.
Hans Werner Richter, 84, German writer.

24
Albert Arlen, 88, Australian pianist.
Alice Bacon, Baroness Bacon, 83, British politician.
Imogen Carpenter, 81, American actress, musician, and composer.
José dos Santos Ferreira, 73, Hong kong poet.
Karen Gershon, 69, German-British writer and poet.
Robert Harris, 41–42, Australian poet, heart attack.
John Hersey, 78, American journalist and novelist (Hiroshima, A Bell for Adano), cancer.
Anton Peterlin, 84, Slovenian physicist.
Herbert Tenzer, 87, American politician.

25
Bogdan Istru, 78, Moldovan poet.
Wally Karbo, 77, American professional wrestling promoter, heart attack.
Jake Porter, 76, American jazz trumpeter and record producer.
Dave Strong, 77, American football player and coach of football and basketball.
Rokkō Toura, 62, Japanese actor.
Billy Wilson, 65, Australian rugby player and coach.

26
Tofiq Bahramov, 68, Soviet and Azerbaijani football player and referee.
James Caleb Boggs, 83, American lawyer and politician.
Louis Falco, 50, American choreographer, AIDS.
Reuben Fine, 78, American chess player, psychologist, and author.
Lewis Hanke, 88, American historian of colonial Latin America.
Edwin Norton, 67, New Zealand weightlifter.
Roy Riegels, 84, American football player, Parkinson's disease.
Anatoli Yatskov, 79, Soviet consul and intelligence officer during World War II.

27
Peter Agostini, 80, American sculptor.
Kamal Hassan Ali, 71, Egyptian politician, prime minister (1984–1985).
Charles Anderson, 78, American equestrian and Olympic champion.
Clifford Jordan, 61, American saxophonist, lung cancer.
Arthur Larson, 82, American lawyer, writer, and government official.
Paul László, 93, Hungarian-American architect and interior designer.
Elizabeth Holloway Marston, 100, American attorney and psychologist.
Taško Načić, 58, Serbian actor.
Kate Reid, 62, Canadian actress (Atlantic City, Death of a Salesman, Dallas), cancer.
Ernst Streng, 51, German cyclist.

28
Scott Cunningham, 36, American Wicca writer, lymphoma.
Miklós Horthy, 86, Hungarian noble and politician.
Patrick Lawlor, 69, Canadian politician.
Michael McNair-Wilson, 62, British politician.
Italo Tajo, 77, Italian opera singer.

29
Sir John Rodgers, 1st Baronet, 86, British politician.
Juan Luis Martínez, 50, Chilean avant-garde poet, writer, and visual artist, heart attack.
Štefan Uher, 62, Slovak film director, heart failure.
Jack Stelling, 68, English footballer.

30
Andrée Brunet, 91, French-American Olympic ice skater (1924, 1928, 1932).
Richard Diebenkorn, 70, American painter, emphysema.
Rubén Rojo, 70, Spanish-Mexican actor, cardiovascular disease.
Paolo Todeschini, 72, Italian football player and manager.

31
Ramon Aquino, 75, Filipino Chief Justice of the Supreme Court.
Robert Brookson, 53, Canadian Olympic rower (1964).
Chicháy, 75, Filipino comedian and actress.
Ailwyn Fellowes, 3rd Baron de Ramsey, 83, English hereditary peer.
Manuel Gonzales, 80, Spanish-American comics artist (Disney), heart failure.
Brandon Lee, 28, American actor (The Crow, Rapid Fire, Showdown in Little Tokyo), accidental gunshot wound.
José María Lemus, 81, Salvadorian politician, president (1956–1960), Hodgkin's lymphoma.
Chip Mead, 43, American racing driver, plane crash.
Joe Muha, 71, American football player, coach, and official.
Mitchell Parish, 92, American lyricist.
George Roark, 94, American basketball, baseball, and football player and coach.
Hüseyin Saygun, 73, Turkish football player and football manager.
Angie Xtravaganza, 28, American transgender entertainer, complications from AIDS.

References 

1993-03
 03